Death, Love & Buildings is the second album by Melbourne band Tinpan Orange, released on Vitamin Records in 2007. The album features Renee Geyer on "The Roof". A video for "Myself & the Devil" was directed by Victor Holder.

Track listing
"She Watched Him Dance" – 4:37
"Myself & the Devil – 4:33
"Waiting to Fall" – 4:09
"Narcissus" – 3:59
"Ladies & Gentlemen" – 2:53
"The Tide" – 3:54
"Dying Man" – 2:51
"Sunflower" – 3:42
"The Counting Song" – 4:05
"The Balcony" – 5:30
"The Roof" – 4:49
"Bottle of Whiskey" – 2:31

Personnel
Emily Lubitz – Vocals, Guitar
Jesse Lubitz – Guitar, Vocals
Alex Burkoy – Violin, Mandolin and Guitar
Gidon Symons – Bass
Joel Witenberg – Drums and Percussion

Technical personnel
Jimi Maroudas – producer, engineer, mixer
Tony "Jack the Bear" Mantz – mastering
Paul Joffe – photography
Megg Evans – design

References

2007 albums
Tinpan Orange albums